James Tyrone Giles (born 1943) is a former United States district judge of the United States District Court for the Eastern District of Pennsylvania.

Education and career

Born in Charlottesville, Virginia, Giles received a Bachelor of Arts degree from Amherst College in 1964 and a Bachelor of Laws from Yale Law School in 1967. He was a clerk for the United States Equal Employment Opportunity Commission in 1967, and a field attorney of the National Labor Relations Board in Philadelphia, Pennsylvania, from 1967 to 1968. He was in private practice in Philadelphia from 1968 to 1979.

Federal judicial service

On October 11, 1979, Giles was nominated by President Jimmy Carter to a seat on the United States District Court for the Eastern District of Pennsylvania vacated by Judge Herbert Allan Fogel. Giles was confirmed by the United States Senate on November 26, 1979, and received his commission on November 27, 1979. He served as Chief Judge from 1999 to 2005. He assumed senior status on February 11, 2008, and retired from the court completely on October 3, 2008. He thereafter returned to private practice.

See also 
 List of African-American federal judges
 List of African-American jurists

References

Sources
 

1943 births
Date of birth missing (living people)
Living people
African-American judges
Amherst College alumni
Judges of the United States District Court for the Eastern District of Pennsylvania
Lawyers from Philadelphia
People from Charlottesville, Virginia
United States district court judges appointed by Jimmy Carter
20th-century American judges
Yale Law School alumni